The 2009 Hungarian Figure Skating Championships took place between December 20 and 21, 2008 at the Budapest Gyakorló Jégpálya in Budapest. Skaters competed in the disciplines of men's singles, ladies' singles, and ice dancing on the senior level. The results were used to choose the Hungarian teams to the 2009 World Championships and the 2009 European Championships.

Results

Men

Ladies

Ice dancing

External links
 2009 Hungarian Championships results
 Hungarian Skating Federation
 

Hungarian Figure Skating Championships
2008 in figure skating
Hungarian Figure Skating Championships, 2009
Figure skating